"Boys! (What Did the Detective Say?)" is the debut single by Australian rock band the Sports. The song was written by band members Stephen Cummings and Ed Bates and produced by Joe Camilleri. Released in March 1978 as the lead single from the band's debut studio album Reckless (1978), the song peaked at number 55 on the Australian Kent Music Report.

John Magowan of Woroni described the song as "adolescent bravado".

Track listing
 Australian 7" single (K 7089)
Side A "Boys! (What Did the Detective Say?)" - 2:25
Side B "Modern Don Juan"

Charts

References

1978 songs
1978 debut singles
The Sports songs
Song recordings produced by Joe Camilleri
Mushroom Records singles
Songs written by Stephen Cummings